David Nathan Tataryn (born July 17, 1950) is a Canadian retired professional ice hockey goaltender. He played 25 games in the World Hockey Association with the Toronto Toros during the 1975–76 season and 2 games in the National Hockey League with the New York Rangers during the 1976–77 season. The rest of his career, which lasted from 1975 to 1984, was mainly spent in senior leagues.

Career statistics

Regular season and playoffs

External links
 

1950 births
Living people
Buffalo Norsemen players
Canadian ice hockey goaltenders
Charlotte Checkers (SHL) players
Columbus Owls players
Ice hockey people from Ontario
Mohawk Valley Comets (NAHL) players
New Haven Nighthawks players
New York Rangers players
Niagara Falls Flyers players
Ontario Hockey Association Senior A League (1890–1979) players
St. Louis Blues draft picks
Sportspeople from Greater Sudbury
Toronto Toros players